Franklin Square station is an unused, underground rapid transit station on the PATCO Speedline, operated by the Delaware River Port Authority. It is located under Franklin Square in Philadelphia, Pennsylvania, United States. Opened on June 7, 1936, the station was the first westbound and final eastbound station in Philadelphia, located just west of the Benjamin Franklin Bridge which carries trains over the Delaware River. The station has been opened for four separate intervals, each time eventually being closed for low ridership. , the station was being refurbished and was expected to reopen in April 2024.

History
The station first opened on June 7, 1936, along with 8th Street in Philadelphia and City Hall and Broadway in Camden, New Jersey, as part of Philadelphia Rapid Transit's Bridge Line service. The station was open for several intervals, each time eventually being closed for low ridership. Most recently, the station was refurbished and reopened as a PATCO station in 1976, coinciding with the United States Bicentennial celebration. The station remained open until 1979, when it was closed again due to low ridership. Approximate years of operation were 1936–1939, 1943–1946, 1952–1953, and 1976–1979, with sources varying on the details.

All PATCO trains pass through Franklin Square upon crossing the Benjamin Franklin Bridge and entering Philadelphia. The platform and walkway are visible when looking out of the left side of the train. From the surface, entrances are visible, but sealed by concrete.

Planned reopening
In 2009, the Delaware River Port Authority (DRPA, parent agency of PATCO) announced that it was commissioning a design plan for renovating, modernizing and reopening the Franklin Square station. As of December 2016:

Projections now are at about 1,500 [riders] a day… DRPA's CEO, John Hanson, said a five-year, $28.2 million plan is now in place for the eventual reopening. The DRPA board recently approved moving ahead.  Design work will come first, beginning in 2017. Requests for quotations from engineering firms are due near the end of January. Then comes a short list.  The project will include a modern design, better lighting, improved security, new tile, replacing and securing waterlines, a new entryway on at Race and 7th Streets and an elevator to the station, likely somewhere in Franklin Square Park.  The heavy construction work may not happen until 2020, with the opening the following year.

By 2018, it was announced that the station would be rebuilt starting in April 2020. The United States Department of Transportation gave PATCO officials a $12.6 million grant for the project in November 2019. Due to the COVID-19 pandemic in Pennsylvania, the start of construction was delayed to mid-2021, with an expected opening in 2024. The work involved upgrades to the station's mechanical, electrical, and structural systems.

References

External links
 
 "Ghost station: Franklin Square". Story by Paul Nussbaum & photos by Colin Kerrigan. Philadelphia Inquirer. March 19, 2015.

PATCO Speedline stations in Philadelphia
Railway stations in Philadelphia
Abandoned rapid transit stations
Railway stations in the United States opened in 1936
Railway stations closed in 1979
1936 establishments in Pennsylvania
1979 disestablishments in Pennsylvania
Railway stations located underground in Pennsylvania
Railway stations scheduled to open in 2024